Jose Martinez (born 16 April 1951) is a Canadian boxer. He competed in the men's lightweight event at the 1972 Summer Olympics. At the 1972 Summer Olympics, he lost to Giambattista Capretti of Italy.

References

1951 births
Living people
Canadian male boxers
Olympic boxers of Canada
Boxers at the 1972 Summer Olympics
Boxers from Montreal
Lightweight boxers